Torna! (i.e. "Come Back!") is a 1953 Italian melodrama film directed by Raffaello Matarazzo and starring Amedeo Nazzari and Yvonne Sanson.

Plot

Cast 
 
Amedeo Nazzari as Roberto Varesi
Yvonne Sanson as  Susanna
Franco Fabrizi as  Giacomo Marini
 Enrica Dyrell as  Viviana
 Giovanna Scotto as  Antonia
 Liliana Gerace as  Luisa
 Maria Grazia Sandri as  Lidia
Teresa Franchini as  Reverend Mother
Olinto Cristina as  Attorney
Rita Livesi as  Governess
 Giulio Tomasini as  Vittorio
 Giorgio Capecchi as  Lawyer Antonio Mezzara 
Nino Marchesini as  Notary

References

External links

Italian drama films
1953 drama films
1953 films
Films directed by Raffaello Matarazzo
Melodrama films
1950s Italian films